Miz or the Miz may refer to:

 Miz (singer) (Mizuki Watanabe, born 1981), Japanese singer and actress
 The Miz, ring name of Mike Mizanin (born 1980), an American professional wrestler
 The Miz, nickname of Steve Mizerak (1944–2006), an American professional pool player
 Ms., usually pronounced  ("Miz"), an English-language honorific for women regardless of marital status
 Miz Cracker (born 1984), American drag queen

See also
 MS (disambiguation)
 Mrs. (disambiguation)
 Miss (disambiguation)
 MIS (disambiguation)
 Mistress (disambiguation)
 Missus (disambiguation)
 Les Misérables (musical), colloquially known as Les Miz